CaSNP is database for storing data about copy number alterations from SNP arrays for different types of cancer.

References

External links
 https://web.archive.org/web/20110719204256/http://cistrome.dfci.harvard.edu/CaSNP/

Genetics databases
Cancer research
Genetics
Microarrays